Holy Water Joe is a 1971 Italian Spaghetti Western film directed by Mario Gariazzo.

Plot
In the immediate aftermath of the American Civil War (1861-1865), Jeff Donovan's outlaw gang, disguised as soldiers of both the Confederacy and the Union, rob banks using a cannon concealed in a wagon. A man about town by the name of Holy Water Joe, called such to differentiate between him and his father, Fire Water Joe, finds himself penniless when all his savings are gone due to a bank robbery by the Donovan gang. Joe finds an opportunity to recoup some of his losses when he captures a deserter from the gang and sells him to Donovan, that creates double dealing and gunplay.

Cast 
 Lincoln Tate as Holy Water Joe
 Ty Hardin as Jeff Donovan
 Richard Harrison as Charlie Bennett 
  Giulio Baraghini as Jim (credited as Lee Banner) 
  Silvia Monelli as Estella 
 Tuccio Musumeci as The Sicilian 
  Pietro Ceccarelli as Sergeant Butch 
 Dante Maggio as The Banker
 Mario Novelli as Donovan Henchman

References

External links

1971 films
1970s Western (genre) comedy films
Spaghetti Western films
1970s Italian-language films
English-language Italian films
Films scored by Marcello Giombini
Films set in the 1860s
1971 comedy films
1970s Italian films